Walasse Ting (13 October 1929 – May 17, 2010) was a Chinese-American visual artist and poet. His colorful paintings have attracted critical admiration and a popular following. Common subjects include nude women and cats, birds and other animals.

He was born on 13 October 1929 in Shanghai, left China in 1946 and lived for a while in Hong Kong, then settled in Paris in 1952. There, he associated with artists such as Karel Appel, Asger Jorn, and Pierre Alechinsky, members of the avant-garde group CoBrA.
Ting started his career as an artist in Paris in the 1950s, where he became friends with artists such as Sam Francis and Pierre Alechinsky. His early works were influenced by the CoBrA group, a European art movement known for its use of expressive, childlike imagery. In the 1960s, Ting moved to New York City and became associated with the Pop Art movement.
Ting is perhaps best known for his series of paintings featuring women, which he called "Cat Women." These works often featured female figures surrounded by flowers and other decorative elements. Ting was also known for his collaborations with poets, including Allen Ginsberg and Gary Snyder, and his own poetry, which often featured themes of love and desire.

In 1957, he moved to the United States, and settled in New York where his work was influenced by pop art and abstract expressionism. He began primarily as an abstract artist, but the bulk of his work since the mid-1970s has been described as popular figuratism, with broad areas of color painted with a Chinese brush and acrylic paint.

He lived in Amsterdam in the 1990s, but regularly moved between there and New York.

He is the author of 13 books, including "All in my Head" (Walasse Ting & Roland Topor, 1974) and "One Cent Life" (Eberhard W. Kornfeld, 1964) a portfolio of 62 original lithographs by 28 artists, including Andy Warhol, Roy Lichtenstein, Kiki Kogelnik, Tom Wesselmann, James Rosenquist, Asger Jorn, Pierre Alechinsky, Karel Appel, Claes Oldenburg, Joan Mitchell, Robert Rauschenberg and Sam Francis.

He won the Guggenheim Fellowship  Award (for Drawing) in 1970.

His works are found in the permanent collections of many museums worldwide, including the Guggenheim Museum, New York; Museum of Modern Art, New York; Art Institute of Chicago; Tate Modern, London; Centre Pompidou, Paris and the Hong Kong Museum of Art, among others.

He was sometimes referred to by his Chinese name "丁雄泉" or its various romanizations: Ding Xiongquan or Ting Hsiung-ch'uan.
Ding Xiongquan was born in Wuxi, Jiangsu Province, China in 1929. He grew up in Shanghai. When he was young, he attended the Shanghai Academy of Fine Arts. He moved to Hong Kong in 1946 and went to France in 1952. During the Paris period, Ding Xiongquan met Karel Appel, Asger Jorn, Pierre Alechinsky, Corneille, and other Cobra artists, and jointly held many exhibitions. At that time, his works were more abstract and implied a strong sense of oriental spirit. Ding Xiongquan went to New York in 1958. Influenced by abstract expressionism, he began to splash paint on the canvas. In the 1970s, her gorgeous color and female-themed style gradually formed, and her works integrated the spirit of eastern and western painting performances, which reached their peak in the 1980s. In 1970, Ding Xiongquan won a painting grant from the Guggenheim Memorial Foundation, and his works are stored in many world-class art galleries. In the mid-1980s, he set up a studio in Amsterdam, the Netherlands, and settled in Amsterdam, the Netherlands in 2001. He was unable to create after a stroke in 2002.
Ting died on May 17, 2010, at aged 80 in New York, US.

References

External links
 Large collection of original Walasse Ting paintings at Gallery Delaive
 Original paintings by Walasse Ting for sale
 Website about Walasse Ting in Chinese - Xiongquan Ding - 丁雄泉
 Biography at rogallery.com
 Biography at artrepublic.com. Gives slightly different timeline.
 Biography and gallery at delaive.com.
 Walasse Ting in Auction
 Walasse Ting's obituary

1929 births
2010 deaths
Artists from Shanghai
American contemporary painters
20th-century American painters
American male painters
Abstract painters
20th-century American male artists